The Washington Nationals radio network is a United States radio network airing Washington Nationals baseball games in the mid-Atlantic region of the United States.  The Washington Nationals Radio Network consists of 18 full-powered stations (15 AM, 3 FM) supplemented by 8 analog AM-to-FM translators and 3 digital HD subchannels.  The flagship is WJFK-FM/106.7.

The Nationals' broadcast team consists of play-by-play announcer Charlie Slowes and color announcer Dave Jageler.  Additionally, Byron Kerr hosts "Nats Insider", and Phil Wood hosts "Nats Talk Live".

Network stations

Delaware (1 station + 1 translator)
Milford (Dover market): WNCL/930
Milford: W271CX/102.1

Maryland (3 stations + 2 HD subchannels + 2 translators)
Bethesda (Washington, D.C. market): WIAD-HD3/94.7-3 (relay of WJFK-FM)
Cumberland: WCMD/1230
Cumberland: W271AT/102.1
Frederick: WWFD/820
Frederick: W232DG/94.3
Frederick: WTLP-HD2/103.9-2 (relay of WFED)
Thurmont: WTHU/1450

North Carolina (3 stations + 1 translator)
Manteo (Outer Banks market): WOBX-FM/98.1
New Bern: WWNB/1490
New Bern: W280ED/103.9
Winterville (Greenville market): WECU/1570

Virginia (8 stations + 1 HD subchannel + 3 translators)
Charlottesville: WCHV/1260
Charlottesville: WCHV-FM/107.5
Front Royal: WFTR/1450
Harrisonburg: WKCY/1300
Harrisonburg: W300CN/107.9
Lynchburg: WBRG/1050
Lynchburg: W286CX/105.1
Manassas (Washington, D.C. market): WJFK-FM/106.7 (flagship)
Richmond: WRVA/1140 (except weekday afternoon games and games that conflict with NASCAR races)
Richmond: WTVR-FM-HD2/98.1-2
Richmond: W241AP/96.1
Waynesboro: WKCI/970

Washington, D.C. (1 station + 1 HD subchannel)
WFED/1500 -- no longer an affiliate beginning with 2021 season
WTOP-FM-HD2/103.5-2

West Virginia (1 station + 1 translator)
Martinsburg: WRNR/740
Martinsburg: W293AM/106.5

References

External links 
 2016 affiliates page on the Washington Nationals site

See also
List of XM Satellite Radio channels
List of Sirius Satellite Radio stations
List of Washington Nationals broadcasters

Washington Nationals
Major League Baseball on the radio
Sports radio networks in the United States